Qarnayn Airport  is a small private airfield operated by the Abu Dhabi National Oil Company. It serves the oil field at Qarnayn, Abu Dhabi, UAE.

References

Airports in the United Arab Emirates